"Honeymoon in Hell" is a science fiction short story by American writer Fredric Brown, first published in 1950. It was the title story of a short story anthology published in 1958.

Contents 
Honeymoon in Hell
Too Far
Man of Distinction
Millennium
The Dome
Blood
Hall of Mirrors
Experiment
The Last Martian
Sentry
Mouse
Naturally
Voodoo
"Arena"
Keep Out
First Time Machine
And the Gods Laughed
The Weapon
A Word from Our Sponsor
Rustle of Wings
Imagine

Adaptations 
In 1956 the short story Honeymoon in Hell was adapted for radio on NBC's X Minus One program.

In 1987, Mexican filmmaker Guillermo del Toro adapted Naturally into a short film entitled Geometria.

References

External links 

1958 short story collections
1958 short stories
Fiction set in 1962
Fiction set in 1963
Short stories set on the Moon
Short stories adapted into films
Short story collections by Fredric Brown